Censored Colors is the third studio album by American rock band Portugal. The Man.  The album was released through a partnership with Equal Vision Records on September 16, 2008.  This partnership is not a traditional record contract, as the band "could work at their own pace and be intimately involved in all factors of their recording career."

The album leaked onto the Internet on August 25, 2008. The following day, the band posted a blog entry discussing the leak and their support of music downloading, encouraging their fans to download, share, and give feedback about the album.

Track listing

Personnel

Portugal. The Man
John Baldwin Gourley – vocals, guitar, organ, drum machines
Zachary Carothers – bass guitar, backing vocals
Jason Sechrist – drums, backing vocals
Ryan Neighbors – organ, synthesizer, piano, vocals, Fender Rhodes

Technical personnel
Kirk Huffman – production, engineering
Phillip Peterson – production, engineering, arranging 
Paul Q. Kolderie – production, mixing
Adam Taylor – production, mixing
Ian Kennedy – mastering
Rich Holtzman – management

Additional musicians
Matt Clifford – slide guitar
Kirk Huffman – guitar, percussion, vocals
Thomas Hunter – slide guitar
Garrett Lunceford - percussion
Victoria Parker – violin
Aaron Perrino – vocals, moog synthesizer
Zoe Manville - vocals
Charles Peterson – shouts
Philip Peterson – synthesizer, harmonica, percussion, trombone, trumpet, accordion, cello, harp, vocals
Anthony Saffery – sitar
Ryan Sollee – vocals

References

2008 albums
Portugal. The Man albums
Albums produced by Paul Q. Kolderie
Equal Vision Records albums